The Limited Mail is a 1925 American silent drama film directed by George Hill and written by Charles Logue and Darryl F. Zanuck. The film stars Monte Blue, Vera Reynolds, Willard Louis, Tom Gallery, Jack Huff, and Eddie Gribbon. The film was released by Warner Bros. on September 5, 1925.

Plot
As described in a film magazine reviews, Bob Wilson becomes a tramp after his fiancée jilts him, but is influenced for good by Jim Fowler, a railway mail clerk. Bob gets employment with the railroad that employs Jim and works his way up to the post of engine driver. Both men fall in love with Caroline Dale, a waitress at the railroad hotel, but the young woman loves only Bob. Bob’s former fiancée accidentally finds him and leaves her husband to be with him. Caroline misunderstands the situation and Bob nearly loses hope of winning her love. Bob is elevated to the engine cab of the Limited Mail train, and on his first run the train is wrecked. Jim, who is in the mail coach, is killed. Bob, fearing imprisonment for negligence, hides out with a tramp friend of his former days. One day he prevents the wrecking of another train and then returns to Caroline. He makes his explanation to the company and to Caroline, and he and the young woman are married.

Cast

Preservation
A copy of The Limited Mail is held by the Library of Congress and a 16mm print is in the Wisconsin Center for Film and Theater Research. Several copies of The Limited Mail also preserved in film collections in Netherlands and France.

References

External links

Stills at silenthollywood.com

1925 films
1920s English-language films
Silent American drama films
1925 drama films
Warner Bros. films
Films directed by George Hill
American silent feature films
American black-and-white films
1920s American films